The Marxist–Leninist Communist Organization – Proletarian Way ( or OCML-VP) is a French Maoist organization formed in 1976, whose political practice is Marxist-Leninist and Maoist.

Origins 

Founded in September 1976, MLCO Proletarian Way traces its roots from the student and workers' movement of May 1968. It absorbed militants from various previously disbanded Marxist–Leninist organisations, such as Gauche prolétarienne.

Activities 

Proletarian Way is active in all the struggles of the working class and the proletariat, in factories and popular neighborhoods. For example, the struggle for employment, support for immigrants, against sexism and homophobia etc.

In trade unions, particularly in General Confederation of Labour, it participates in the development of red fraction with the blog "Où va la CGT?".

Proletarian Way also organized various internationalists events like Revolutionary Association of the Women of Afghanistan tours in France.

Elections 

MLCO Proletarian Way does not participate in the elections and called for abstention in presidential election in 2012.

International 

The organization takes part in the International Conference of Marxist–Leninist Parties and Organizations (International Newsletter).
Proletarian Way also support the people war in India and Philippines.

Publications 

Proletarian Way publish the monthly paper Partisan.
It publishes brochures on various topics.

References

External links 

Blog "Où va la CGT ?"

Communist parties in France
Far-left politics in France
Maoist organizations in France
International Conference of Marxist–Leninist Parties and Organizations (International Newsletter)
1976 establishments in France
Political parties established in 1976